Yachay Tech University (Universidad Yachay Tech) is a public university in San Miguel de Urcuquí, Imbabura Province, Ecuador. The university is part of Yachay, a project under development by the government of Ecuador to establish a hub for technological innovation and knowledge intensive businesses. The university opened in the first quarter of 2014 as one of the emblematic institutions in Ecuador. The word Yachay is a Kichwa word that means "knowledge". Yachay Tech is a research oriented institution.

The curriculum focuses on the scientific-technological area, and one of its main components is dual training, where students combine academic learning in the classroom with work practices in the company.

History
Yachay Tech University was planned during the government of the Ecuadorian former President Rafael Correa in 2013 as one of four 'Emblematic Universities', as part of his political project The Citizens' Revolution. However, it is a non-political entity. The university collaborates with public and private research institutions.

On March 31, 2014, it began its academic work, with 187 students from 22 provinces of Ecuador who obtained a place in the National Exam for Higher Education (currently called the EAES exam), entrance exams to the public higher education system from this country.

The Government of Ecuador invested more than one billion dollars in the construction project of the University, initially directed by the public company Siembra EP (Previously Yachay EP). However, of every USD100 invested in such a project, less than USD 9 went to the University. In 6 years, Yachay Tech earmarked approximately USD 90M.

According to the Public Expenditure Observatory of Ecuador, the budget of the universities in 2020 was USD 1.2 billion, of which USD 16.6 million went to Yachay Tech. It placed Yachay in the 23rd position out of 31 higher education institutions that the state finances. With just 1.43% of budget allocation, the university positioned itself as the best in Ecuador for research issues. Yachay Tech, the National Polytechnic School (EPN) and the San Francisco de Quito University (USFQ), lead the country's research podium according to Nature.

By 2040, Yachay Tech plans to have 10,000 students. It was created as a science and technology development university. Its creation file mentions the objectives of promoting scientific research, technological development, and disseminating knowledge. It prioritizes the training of students for scientific activities.

A planned research network was the National Supercomputing Network, developed around Yachay Tech's supercomputer, Quinde I.

In May 2018, the Secretary of Higher Education, Science, Technology and Innovation (Senescyt), Augusto Barrera, apparently ratified his commitment to "resize, give tranquillity, continuity and enhance" the University.

In 2022 the National Assembly member Ana Belén Cordero was accused of libel after saying that the former manager of the university had misspent money. At that time the university had cost over USD 600 million since was created eight years before. Her words were in relation to recent report by the Comptroller General made to the Assembly's Oversight Commission.

Nature Index - Top 10 institutions from Ecuador between 1 May 2020 - 1 April 2021

Study programs
The university consists of five schools.. The academic offer, the lines of research, and the training of the students correspond to the areas that the Ecuadorian government has detected as priorities for the change of the country's productive matrix.

University schools with careers at disposal:

School of Biological Sciences and Engineering

 Biology
 Biomedical Engineering

School of Chemical Sciences and Engineering

Dean: Dr. Vivian Morera

 Chemistry
 Materials Engineering

School of Earth Sciences, Energy and Environment

Dean: Dr. Juan Ruano

 Geology
 Food Agroindustry

School of Mathematical and Computational Sciences

Dean: Dr. Antonio Acosta

 Mathematics
 Information Technologies

School of Physical Sciences and Nanotechnology

Dean: Dr. Gema González Vázquez

 Physics
 Nanotechnology Engineering
 Master in Applied Physics with Major in Nanotechnology (Postgraduate totally in English)

Joint training with the National University of Education:

 Experimental Sciences

Administration and organization

Board of Trustees (2019):
 Spiros Agathos, Ph.D. (President)
 Fabián Obando (Legal Secretary)
 Paul Arellano, Ph.D.
 Hortensia Rodriguez, Ph.D.
 Andreas Griewank, Ph.D.

Academic leadership:
 Rector: Juan Ruano, Ph.D.
 Vice Chancellor of Research and Innovation:  Frank Alexis, Ph.D., since March 2019.
 Dean of the School Biological Sciences and Engineering: Spyros Agathos Ph.D., since November 2015.
 Dean of the School of Chemical Sciences and Engineering: Hortensia Rodriguez Ph.D., since June 2017.
 Dean of the School of Earth Sciences, Energies and Environment: Paul Arellano Ph.D., since June 2017.
 Dean of the School of Mathematical Sciences and Information Technology: Andreas Griewank Ph.D., since July 2016.
 Dean of the School of Physical Sciences and Nanotechnology: Ernesto Medina Ph.D., since  June 2017.

References

External links
 Yachay Tech University - Official website
 Yachay City of Knowledge - Official website 
 Yachay Tech University Virtual tour
 yachaytech.edu.ec/en/about/leadership/

Universities in Ecuador
Educational institutions established in 2014
Buildings and structures in Imbabura Province
2014 establishments in Ecuador